Klein Stanley Eden Cristobal (born 12 December 1996) is a Trinidadian footballer.

Career statistics

Club

Notes

References

1996 births
Living people
Trinidad and Tobago footballers
Trinidad and Tobago expatriate footballers
Association football midfielders
Platense F.C. players
Liga Nacional de Fútbol Profesional de Honduras players
Trinidad and Tobago expatriate sportspeople in Honduras
Expatriate footballers in Honduras